Unternehmen Bodenplatte (Operation Baseplate or Operation Ground Plate), launched on 1 January  1945, was an attempt by the Luftwaffe to cripple Allied air forces in the Low Countries  during Second World War. The Germans husbanded their resources in the preceding months at the expense of the Defence of the Reich units in what was a last-ditch effort to keep up the momentum of the German Army during the stagnant stage of the Battle of the Bulge.

The following is an order of battle of Allied and German forces.

German order of battle
On 31 December 1944, the Luftwaffe had the following available for Bodenplatte under Luftwaffenkommando West (Air Command West) (Joseph Schmid):

II Jagdkorps (Dietrich Peltz)

3rd Jagddivision (3rd Fighter Division) (Walter Grabmann) at Wiedenbrück

Jagdabschnittsführer Mittelrhein (Fighter Sector Leader Middle Rhine)

5th Jagddivision (5th Fighter Division) (Karl Hentschell) at Karlsruhe

3rd Fliegerdivision (3rd Air Division)

Allied order of battle

RAF No. 83 Group
The Allies had the following forces:
No. 83 Group RAF:

RAF No. 84 Group
No. 84 Group RAF:

RAF No. 2 Group
No. 2 Group RAF:

American Tactical Air Forces
Ninth Air Force:

American Strategic Air Forces
Although some of its units were present, the Eighth Air Force is not listed on the Allied order of battle.

See also
 Luftwaffe Organization
 German Air Fleets in World War II

References

Citations

Bibliography
 Bekker, Cajus. Angriffshöhe 4000. 
 Caldwell, Don.JG 26; Top Guns of the Luftwaffe. New York: Ballantine Books, 1991. 
 Caldwell, Donald L. (1994). JG 26 Photographic History of the Luftwaffe's Top Gun. Motorbooks International Publishers & Wholesalers. .
 
 
  
 de Zeng, H.L; Stanket, D.G; Creek, E.J. Bomber Units of the Luftwaffe 1933-1945; A Reference Source, Volume 1. Ian Allan Publishing, 2007. 
 de Zeng, H.L; Stanket, D.G; Creek, E.J. Bomber Units of the Luftwaffe 1933-1945; A Reference Source, Volume 2. Ian Allan Publishing, 2007. 
 Forsythe, Robert. JV 44; The Galland Circus. Burgess Hill, West Sussex, UK: Classic Publications, 1996. 
 Forsythe, Robert & Laurier, Jagdverband 44: Squadron of Experten. Osprey. London. 2008. 
 Franks, Norman The Battle of the Airfields: 1 January 1945. Grub Street. 1994. London.  & 
 Franks, Norman Fighter Command Losses of the Second World War: Volume 3, Operational Losses, Aircraft and Crews 1944-1945. (Incorporating Air Defence Great Britain and 2nd TAF Midland. 2000. London. 
 .
 .
 .
 .
 Johnson, J.E. Wing Leader (Fighter Pilots). London: Goodall Publications Ltd. 2000 (original edition 1956). .
 .
 National Archives. (2000) The Rise and Fall of the German Air Force, 1933-1945. 
 
 Prien, Jochen & Stemmer, Gerhard. Jagdgeschwader 3 "Udet" in World War II. Atlgen, Germany: Schiffer Military History, 2002. 
 
 Weal, John. Jagdgeschwader 27 'Afrika'. Osprey, London. 2003. 
 Weal, John. Focke-Wulf Fw 190 Aces of the Western Front. Osprey, London. 1996. 
 Weal, John. Bf 109 Defence of the Reich Aces. Osprey, London. 2006. 
 Weinberg, Gerhard. A World At Arms, Cambridge University Press: 2 edition, 2005, 
 Zaloga, Steven J., Gerrard, Howard. Battle of the Bulge (2)''. London: Osprey Publishing, 2004. 

Aerial operations and battles of World War II involving Germany
World War II orders of battle